Vladimir Arhipov (born 26 September 1955) is an Estonian politician. He was a member of XIII Riigikogu.

He has been a member of the Estonian Centre Party. Arhipov was the mayor of Maardu from 1995 to 1996 and again from 2016.

References

Living people
1955 births
Estonian Centre Party politicians
Place of birth missing (living people)
Members of the Riigikogu, 2015–2019
Mayors of places in Estonia
Estonian people of Russian descent